William Hogg is a former first-class cricketer. He was born in July 1955 in Ulverston, Lancashire and played for Lancashire and Warwickshire between 1976 and 1983.  A right arm fast bowler, he took 222 first-class wickets in 96 appearances and picked up another 91 wickets in 88 List A one day games.  His father-in-law was fellow cricketer Sonny Ramadhin. Willie's son, Kyle Hogg, also played for Lancashire.

External links
Cricinfo: Willie Hogg

1955 births
English cricketers
Lancashire cricketers
Warwickshire cricketers
Living people
People from Ulverston
Cricketers from Cumbria
Marylebone Cricket Club cricketers
Young England cricketers